Ayşe Sultan ("The living one" or "womanly";  1565, Manisa Palace, Manisa - 15 May 1605, Constantinople) was an Ottoman princess, daughter of Sultan Murad III (reign 1574–1595) and Safiye Sultan, as well as sister of Sultan Mehmed III (reign 1595–1603) of the Ottoman Empire.

Early life
Ayşe Sultan was a daughter of Sultan Murad III, and his consort Safiye Sultan. She had four certain full siblings, two brothers, Sultan Mehmed III, and Şehzade Mahmud, and two sisters Fatma Sultan and Hümaşah Sultan. Her other possible full sibligs were: Şehzade Selim, Mihrimah Sultan and Fahriye Sultan.

Marriages
In 1582, Murad betrothed Ayşe to Ibrahim Pasha. However, her grandmother, Nurbanu Sultan was against this marriage, because she wanted her adoptive son, Kapıcıbaşı Mahmud Bey, who when still a child
had been given to her by her husband Sultan Selim II, to be married to Ayşe. After Nurbanu's death in December 1583, Mahmud married the daughter of Şemsi Pasha in December 1584. In this way, he gave up every hope to eventually marry Ayşe, since in order to marry a princess a man had to repudiate his other wives.

Ayşe Sultan finally married Ibrahim Pasha in 1586. Her wedding took place at the Old Palace, and was celebrated in a seven-day ceremony. Historian Mustafa Selaniki mentions the preparations, the presents which were given by both parties, the feasts, prepared for the Nakibü'l-esraf and the sadat, for the Şeyhülislam (supreme religious leader), the ulema and for the high-ranking officials. A year into the marriage, Murad dismissed Ibrahim Pasha from his post, because according to the chronicle of Hasan Beyzade, his damat, or bridegroom, status was an obstacle to sailing. Ibrahim served three times as Grand Vizier to Ayşe's brother Sultan Mehmed III. By her marriage, Ayse had a son Sultanzade Mehmed Bey and a daughter who both died in infancy.  

Ayşe Sultan was widowed upon Ibrahim Pasha's death on 10 July 1601. Yemişci Hasan Pasha became the new Grand Vizier. A telhis of Hasan Pasha announced that the Sultan Mehmed promised him the hand of Ayşe in marriage. In accordance to this telhis, historian Mustafa Naima suggests that Yemişci Hasan Pasha and Ayşe Sultan were only engaged. The wedding took place on 5 April 1602. The marriage was unhappy for her but when a year later Mehmed decided to execute Yemişci Ayşe dispatched a post to her mother, Safiye Sultan, and her brother, in which she promised that if the Sultan could forgive her husband, they could go to Mecca without any further charge or trouble. However, the Sultan replied to her indicating that she should accompany him in death if she insisted. Yemisci was executed on 18 October 1603. In 1604, she married Güzelce Mahmud Pasha (died 1606).

Charities
Ayşe was well known for her charity. In her testament, she gave the following instructions for her inheritance: her slaves and slave girls were to be manumitted unconditionally; 10,000 akçes were bequeathed to cover the cash debts of people detained in prison for debts of up to 500 akçes; 2,000 akçes were for the poor, sick and orphans, and the remainder for the poor in the Holy Cities of Mecca, Medina, and Jerusalem. A certain amount of money was allocated to pay the ransom for Muslim prisoners of war, with the condition that female captives be freed first.

Death
Ayşe Sultan died on 15 May 1605, and was buried in her brother Mehmed's mausoleum located at Hagia Sophia Mosque, Istanbul.

Issue 
By her first marriage, Ayşe Sultan had a son and a daughter:
Sultanzade Mehmed Bey. Died in infancy. 
Fülane Hanımsultan. Died as newborn.

Legacy
Ayşe Sultan owned a translation of "The Ascension of Propitious Stars and Sources of Sovereignty" (Matali' us-sa'ade ve menabi' us-siyade).

References

Sources
 
 

1570 births
1605 deaths
16th-century Ottoman princesses
17th-century Ottoman princesses